CBS Sexton Street is a Christian Brothers secondary school located in Limerick, Ireland.  The school has approximately 500 students. The current principal is Denis O'Connor, and the current vice principal is Elaine O'Connell.

History
Colaiste Mhichil was founded by Edmund Rice, a Christian Brother, to provide education for boys in Limerick city. Their numbers having declined, the Christian Brothers no longer have day-to-day involvement in the administration of the school. Instead, a lay principal and board of management manage the school with the Christian Brothers remaining as trustees.

The school has been successful in soccer, having won the senior boys' FAI All Ireland soccer championship in 2007 and 2008. In 2012, the school were national runners-up, having lost the final to St Aidans, Cork.

Financier JP McManus, a past pupil of the school, has funded academic scholarships for a number of students each year going to third level. This funding is separate from McManus' national scholarships.

Notable students

 Ned Daly, born in 1891 and educated by the Presentation Sisters and then the Christian Brothers on Sexton Street. He served as commandant of Dublin's 1st Battalion in the Easter Rising. He was executed by firing squad in Kilmainham Gaol on 4 May 1916.
 John Philip Holland, born in Liscannor, County Clare in 1841. Holland began his studies at Sexton Street in 1853. He was the developer of the first submarines to be commissioned by both the U.S. Navy and Royal Navy.
 David Hanly, presenter of Morning Ireland on RTÉ Radio 1 
 Tony Holohan, Chief Medical Officer for Ireland
 Ciaran MacMathuna, broadcaster and authority on Irish music
 J. P. McManus, businessman and racehorse owner
 Diarmuid Scully, member of Limerick City Council and former Mayor of Limerick
 Karl Spain, comedian

Notable teachers
 Pat Fleury, hurler
 Willie Moore, hurler

References

Secondary schools in County Limerick
Congregation of Christian Brothers secondary schools in the Republic of Ireland
Education in Limerick (city)